Ålsgårde is a former fishing village on the north coast of Zealand, Denmark, located six kilometer northwest of Helsingør. 

Formerly Ålsgårde was a separate town, but today it has merged with the neighbouring town of Hellebæk into an urban area with a population of 5,790 (1 January 2022).

Notable buildings

Rytterhuset (Nordre Strandvej 230) iwas built in 1889 as summer residence for the painter Frants Henningsen to a National Romantic design by Martin Nyrop. The property, including a jetty with a bathhouse and a couple of outbuildings, is now listed in the Danish registry of protected buildings and places. Nordre Strandvej 140, a half-timbered house from 1819, is also listed. Hellebæk Church is, in spite of its name, also located in Ålsgårde.

Notable people 
 Laura Kieler (1849 – 1932 in Ålsgårde) a Norwegian-Danish novelist
 August Hassel (1864 - 1942 in Ålsgårde) a Danish sculptor.
 Harald Leth (1899 – 1986 in Ålsgårde) a Danish naturalistic painter

References

Helsingør Municipality
Neighbourhoods in Denmark